Ramírez Island is the northernmost of the three Bugge Islands), lying off Wordie Ice Shelf in the south part of Marguerite Bay, Fallières Coast, Antarctica. The island was named "Isla Eleuterio Ramirez" by the Chilean Antarctic Expedition, 1947, possibly after a member of the expedition. A concise form of the original name has been approved.

See also 
 List of Antarctic and sub-Antarctic islands

References 

Islands of Graham Land
Fallières Coast